Moara Nouă may refer to:

 Moara Nouă, Sălcioara, Dâmbovița, Romania
 Moara Nouă, Berceni, Prahova, Romania